is a 1962 Japanese satirical comedy film directed by Yūzō Kawashima and written by Kaneto Shindō.

Plot
The family of ex-naval officer Tokizo Maeda lives in a small urban concrete block apartment, always quick at hiding their belongings when the situation asks for a humble appearance. While daughter Tomoko, mistress (at her father's instruction) of a famous bestselling writer, won't stop borrowing money from her patron for the family, son Minoru, signed to a music talent agency, constantly embezzles the company's assets. Father and son both have their very own plans for the money: Tokizo invests in one military project after another, Minoru, to his father's consternation, spends it on his lover Yukie, none other than his agency's bookkeeper. When Yukie quits her job, using the occasion to end the liaison with Minoru, it turns out that she also had affairs with the company boss and the tax officer in charge, using the donations she received to finance her own hotel.

Cast
 Ayako Wakao as Yukie Mitani
 Yūnosuke Itō as Tokizo Maeda
 Hisano Yamaoka as Yoshino, Tokizo's wife
 Yūko Hamada as Tomoko, Tokizo's daughter
 Hideo Takamatsu as Ichiro Katori
 Eiji Funakoshi as Eisaku Kamiya, the tax collector
 Manamitsu Kawabata as Minoru, Tokizo's son
 Shōichi Ozawa as Pinosaku, the singer
 Kyū Sazanka as Shuntaro Yoshizawa, the writer

Reception
Film scholar Alexander Jacoby called The Graceful Brute Kawashima's (who died the following year) last noteworthy film, stating that its "theatrical artificiality" and use of one single set mirrored director Nagisa Ōshima's techniques.

References

External links
 

1962 films
1962 comedy films
Japanese comedy films
Films directed by Yuzo Kawashima
Films with screenplays by Kaneto Shindo
1960s Japanese films